Auxier is an unincorporated community and census-designated place (CDP) in Floyd County, Kentucky, United States. The 2010 United States Census reported that Auxier's population was 669, of which 661 persons were white and 2 persons were black.

History
Auxier had its start around 1900 as a coal town. The community was named for the local Auxier family.

Geography
Auxier is located along the northern edge of Floyd County, bordered to the south, east, and northeast by the Levisa Fork and to the north by Johnson County.

Demographics

References

Census-designated places in Floyd County, Kentucky
Census-designated places in Kentucky
Coal towns in Kentucky